The digital terrestrial television system was launched in Thailand in 2014. it employs DVB-T2 as its digital encoding standard.

The Broadcast Commission (BC) under the National Broadcasting and Telecommunications Commission (NBTC) announced in the last quarter of 2013 that it plans to give DTTV license through open auction within December 2013. The prospectus has been priced at 1 million baht and many of the incumbent content owners providers as well as studios bought the prospectus.  If all goes well, the auction will result in 4 categories of licenses: High Definition TV, Standard Definition TV, Children TV and Digital News TV.  The number of provider who will survive the auction is still unknown.

Prior to the auction announcement, BC quietly granted a bottleneck "network" license to existing government incumbent which means that all the new DTTV providers have to send DTTV signal to these governmental MUX providers at the price fixed by the providers themselves.  In response to claim of uncertainty and in order to lessen financial risk to potential bidders might face after the granting of license, BC came out to state that it encouraged the "potential" bidders to "negotiate" MUX price/charge before going into the bidding room.

List of channels on multiplexes 
	

note (*) Temporary broadcast or Broadcast experiment

Multiplexes (MUX) 
Digital television network operators in Thailand consists of Royal Thai Army (2 Multiplexes), MCOT, The Government Public Relations Department (PRD) and Thai Public Broadcasting Service (ThaiPBS)

See also 
 Television in Thailand
 Digital television transition

Notes

References 

Thailand
Television in Thailand
Telecommunications in Thailand